Holm Village is a village in the Scottish Outer Hebrides, on the Isle of Lewis near Stornoway. The modern area of Holm can be split into two distinct areas - "Holm Village" and "Holm Road with Parkend". Holm is within the parish of Stornoway.

The Iolaire Memorial on Holm Point commemorates Admiralty Yacht HMS Iolaire, lost on rocks lying to the south in 1919. 205 died, many of them war veterans returning to the island.

See also 
 Lewis and Harris
 History of the Outer Hebrides

References

External links 

 Visitor's guide for the Isle of Lewis
 Website of the Western Isles Council with links to other resources
 Disabled access to Lewis for residents and visitors
 
 A Guide to living in the Outer Hebrides, with most information pertaining to Lewis

Villages in the Isle of Lewis